Greenwood–Afton Rural Historic District is a national historic district located at Greenwood, Albemarle County, Virginia.  The district encompasses 839 contributing buildings, 55 contributing sites, 68 contributing structures, and 2 contributing objects.  The district is characterized by large farms, historic villages, and crossroads communities. Ten properties are separately listed on the National Register of Historic Places.

It was added to the National Register of Historic Places in 2011, and enlarged by the addition of two properties in 2016.

See also
National Register of Historic Places listings in Albemarle County, Virginia

References

Historic districts in Albemarle County, Virginia
National Register of Historic Places in Albemarle County, Virginia
Historic districts on the National Register of Historic Places in Virginia